Neohermenias is a genus of moths belonging to the subfamily Olethreutinae of the family Tortricidae.

Species
Neohermenias melanocopa (Meyrick, 1912)
Neohermenias thalassitis (Meyrick, 1910)

Taxonomy
The genus is listed as a synonym of Holocola by some authors.

See also
List of Tortricidae genera

References

Eucosmini
Tortricidae genera
Taxa named by Alexey Diakonoff